Solidaridad is a bookstore in the Ermita district of Manila, the Philippines. Having first opened its doors in 1964, it is owned by Philippine national artist F. Sionil José and managed by him and his family. It is sometimes called "The best little bookstore in Asia".

The shop features the owner's own works and works by other Filipino authors such as Jose Rizal, Nick Joaquin, F. Sionil Jose, Paz Marquez, N.V.M. Gonzalez, Gilda Cordero-Fernando, Bienvenido Santos, Lualhati Bautista.  Selected foreign titles are also offered at the bookstore. It has been claimed that they have the widest selection of Filipiniana works in the Philippines.

References

Bookstores of the Philippines